Daniel Pieter Prinsloo (born 7 January 1992) is a South African professional basketball player who plays for the Cape Town Tigers of the BAL and for the South Africa national team.

Early life
Born in Pretoria West, Prinsloo was initially interested in playing cricket or rugby. When his father emigrated to the United States, he started playing football.

Professional career
After spending the first four years as professional in several teams from Latin America and Africa. His first contract was with ExSAL Santa Tecla in El Salvador. He later joined Los Trinis de la Trinidad, a team based in Nicaragua. In 2016, he had a short stint with Bolivian team Calero in the Liga Boliviana de Basquetbol. After this, Prinsloo returned to Nicaragua to play for Costa Caribe Managua.

In September 2018, Prinsloo signed for Spanish LEB Plata team Círculo Gijón. However, due to problems with his visa, he could not arrive to Asturias until December.
 
In 2017, Prinsloo played his first professional contract with the Lagos City Stars in the Continental Basketball League.

Since 2020, Prinsloo plays with newly-established club Cape Town Tigers. He was an instrumental part for the team in the 2022 BAL Qualifying Tournaments.

International career
Prinsloo played the AfroBasket 2017 with the South Africa national basketball team. He averaged 12.3 points and 4.7 rebounds in the three games he played.

References

External links
Profile at Eurobasket.com
Profile at Spanish Basketball Federation 
Profile at Promosport.ws 

1992 births
Living people
Cape Town Tigers players
Centers (basketball)
Círculo Gijón players
Expatriate basketball people in Spain
Marist Red Foxes men's basketball players
South African expatriate basketball people
South African expatriate sportspeople in Spain
South African men's basketball players
Clube Ferroviário da Beira basketball players
Stade Nabeulien basketball players